Stephen James Chidwick (born 10 May 1989) is an English professional poker player from Deal, Kent. Chidwick led the Global Poker Index (GPI) from April 18 to October 9, 2018.

Poker
Chidwick began playing live poker tournaments in 2008. He plays online under the alias "stevie444" and "TylersDad64" on various online poker cardrooms. In 2009, Chidwick finished runner-up in the Full Tilt FTOPS Event #17 winning $142,155.30. In 2010, Chidwick made his first cash in World Series of Poker, cashing in three events.

In 2015, Chidwick made two final tables finishing runner-up in the $10,000 Seven-Card Stud Hi-Low Championship, winning $180,529 in the process.

In 2018, Chidwick finished 3rd in the partypoker LIVE MILLIONS Grand Final Barcelona €10,300 main event winning $1,240,000. He finished 4th in the Card Player Poker Tour Venetian DeepStack Championship Poker Series $5,000 main event, winning $177,091. For 2018, Chidwick made the second most final tables in live poker tournaments, with a total of 26, finishing behind Jake Schindler, who made 31. Chidwick started 2019 as the United Kingdom's Global Poker Index leader with 3602.31 points.

In 2019, Chidwick won his first WSOP bracelet in the $25,000 Pot Limit Omaha High Roller event, earning more than $1.6 million.

As of November 2019, his accumulated live poker tournament winnings exceed $32,300,000 placing him 1st on the England all-time money list and 8th on the all-time money list.

World Series of Poker bracelets

References

External links
 Stephen Chidwick Hendon Mob profile

Living people
1989 births
People from Deal, Kent
English poker players
World Series of Poker bracelet winners